The field ration eating device (FRED) is an Australian eating utensil and multi-tool that serves as a combination of a can opener, bottle opener, and spoon. As its name suggests, it is issued to the Australian Defence Force for use with its Combat Ration One Man field rations. It was first issued around 1943.

Its NATO Stock Number (NSN) is 7330-66-010-0931 and the item name is "opener, hand, can". It is also humorously referred to as the "fucking ridiculous eating device".

See also 

 P-38 can opener

References

Further reading

External links

Military equipment of the Australian Army
Eating utensils
Military food